Sir Robert Carswell (1793–1857) was a Scottish professor of pathology, who described and illustrated many of the clinical details of multiple sclerosis but did not identify it as a separate disease.

Life
Carswell was born in 
Paisley, Scotland, on 3 February 1793, and studied medicine at the University of Glasgow. While a student he employed by Dr. John Thompson of Edinburgh to make a collection of drawings illustrating morbid anatomy. He travelled to the continent, and spent two years (1822–3) working at the hospitals of Paris and Lyon, while working on this collection. He returned to Scotland, and took his degree of M.D. at Marischal College, Aberdeen, in 1826. After this he went again to Paris, and resumed his studies in morbid anatomy under Pierre Charles Alexandre Louis.

Around 1828 Carswell was chosen by University College, London as professor of pathological anatomy; but before entering on his teaching duties was commissioned to prepare a collection of pathological drawings. He therefore remained in Paris after receiving this commission till 1831, when he had completed a series of two thousand water-colour drawings of diseased structures. He then took the duties of his professorship. At the same time, or soon afterwards, he became physician to the University College Hospital.

About 1836 Carswell took up private medical practice, but did not meet with great success. In poor health, he in 1840 resigned his professorship, and was appointed  physician to the Leopold I of Belgium and his royal family.  He lived at Laeken, near Brussels, making several journeys to the south in search of health. Carswell made no further contributions to medical science. He was knighted in July 1850 by Queen Victoria for his services to Louis-Philippe I when an exile in the United Kingdom. He died on 15 June 1857, of chronic lung disease. He married Marguerite Chardenot, who survived him, but left no issue.

Works

Carswell's major work, published in 1837, was Illustrations of the Elementary Forms of Disease, with coloured plates. He wrote also journal articles, and in the Cyclopædia of Practical Medicine the articles "Induration", "Melanosis", "Mortification", "Perforation", "Scirrhus", "Softening", and "Tubercle".

References

Attribution

External links

 UCL Library Services, Art for medicine's sake: The restoration of the drawings of Sir Robert Carswell.

1793 births
1857 deaths
Alumni of the University of Aberdeen
Scottish pathologists
Scottish knights